Michael Yon (born 1964) is an American writer and photographer. He served in the Special Forces in the early-1980s, and he became a writer in the mid-1990s. He focused on military writing after the invasion of Iraq. Yon has been embedded on numerous occasions with American and British troops in Iraq, most prominently a deployment with the 1st Battalion, 24th Infantry Regiment (Deuce Four) of the 25th Infantry Division in Mosul, Iraq that ended in September 2005.

Yon has had vocal feuds with the United States military hierarchy, and the nature of his reports is also controversial. However, Yon at one time enjoyed "rock star" status among individual soldiers, according to Brian Williams of NBC. Yon's alternative media reporting has been mentioned by numerous mainstream media agencies, and he has won accolades from the 2005, 2007, and 2008 Weblog Awards. In 2008, The New York Times reported that he has spent more time embedded with combat units than any other journalist in Iraq. He shifted the focus of his blogging from Iraq to Afghanistan in August 2008. His work is supported primarily by donations from readers.

Background
Yon grew up in Winter Haven, Florida, where he essentially raised himself. As a child and as a young adult, he was a prankster who got in trouble for, among other things, making homemade bombs. Other children bullied him repeatedly throughout his childhood, particularly because of his short stature. He went to a local community college and did not express any interest in journalism. After graduation, he enlisted in the United States Army in his late teens for the college money.

Because of his light blond hair, short stature, and physical boastfulness, other soldiers nicknamed him "Bam Bam" after the Flintstones character. He killed a man in a barroom fight in Ocean City, Maryland in the 1980s; criminal charges were filed but later dropped. Yon's first book, Danger Close, details this event and tells the story of his life up to the age of 20, after he had completed the selection and training process for the United States Army Special Forces. 
Yon was discharged from the Army in 1987 and worked in a variety of different businesses, and for a while provided security detail for the late pop star Michael Jackson. He later described Jackson as a "hostage of his own success" while also stating that he enjoyed his experiences with him at Neverland Ranch before the scandals. Having learned German and some Polish within the service, he also attempted to work in Poland. He started general freelance writing in the mid-1990s despite having no background in the field. Notably, he covered the Aghori, an obscure Hindu cult that eats human flesh to gain magic powers supposedly. Yon believed that he had located an American cult member and passed his suspicions on to the FBI. He began writing about the occupation of Iraq after the death of two of his army friends, one of whom he had known since high school.

Yon first landed in Baghdad in late December 2004. He covered the war in Iraq for several years afterward, notably covering the Deuce Four forces. Yon briefly stopped over to Afghanistan in early 2006. In December 2007, Yon was present in Basra with 4th Battalion, The Rifles during the British withdrawal from the city. He subsequently visited England and met the Duchess of Cornwall. Yon praised her for what he saw as her unstinting support for her troops.

Yon moved to covering the War in Afghanistan in August 2008, which he said had become the most important field in the war on terrorism. He attempted to travel to Pakistan in June 2009, but his visa application was denied. That month, he also traveled to Singapore, Bahrain, the Philippines, and Turkey to report on Secretary of Defense Robert Gates' security meetings. From July 2019 until he was deported on 5 February 2020, Yon had been reporting on the ground from the 2019 Hong Kong Protests.

In January 2021, Michael Yon attended the 2021 United States Capitol attack but stayed outside of the US Capitol. In an interview with Epoch Times, he claimed he witnessed Antifa, not white nationalist militias such as Proud Boys or Oath Keepers as other media have reported, "clearly led" the insurrection. However, Media Matters said that the Epoch Times promoted the "Stop the Steal" Capitol rally that led to the riot.

Personal views
Yon has stated, in general, that "If a writer wants to make money, he should avoid truth and tell people what they want to hear. Yet to win the war, tell the truth." He supports embedded journalism over traditional reporting, believing that the closer writers are to events the less likely they are to repeat military public relations spin. Yon was reluctant to say about whether he supported the decision to go to war. He eventually said he had been a supporter because to his concerns about Iraq's alleged weapons of mass destruction, which he had given the Bush Administration the benefit of the doubt over.

After first visiting Iraq in December 2004, Yon said the situation in the country was far more violent than the mainstream media had reported. During the next year, he reported that "Iraq was falling apart" and was in a civil war. He also believed that NATO forces were "losing" the war in Afghanistan. Yon was a vocal proponent of a 'surge' strategy in Iraq and expressed his support in many interviews for Senator John McCain in the 2008 Presidential election. Agreeing with McCain, Yon opposes the use of torture by the U.S. military, and specifically opposes waterboarding. In June 2009, he remarked: "I get the feeling that Obama is tougher and proving wiser than many people seem to think". Yon also wrote in the aftermath of the Iranian election protests that he agreed with controversial author Michael Ledeen's views about Iran. In an August 2009 interview at Helmand Province, he reiterated his belief that the Afghan Taliban are stronger than the NATO presence, comparing the situation to Apocalypse Now.

Describing how his personal views affect his writing, Yon stated, "I feel no shame in saying I am biased in favor of our troops. Even worse, I feel no shame in calling a terrorist a terrorist". The New York Times commented that "Like most bloggers, Mr. Yon has an agenda, writing often that the United States’ mission to build a stable, democratic Iraq is succeeding and must continue." The Los Angeles Times has called him "the reporter of choice for many conservatives", although journalist Michael Totten calls Yon a "refreshingly unideological analyst of the war". Yon has praised several media agencies he has worked with, saying "The journalists for places like the New York Times and Wall Street Journal are actually very good with their facts."

In his 2008 book Moment of Truth in Iraq, Yon wrote:

Yon supports the personal use of his images and writings by ordinary people, but he believes that larger institutions such as television networks and magazines should respect his copyright. As such, he has taken on numerous legal cases. He wrote in August 2008 that he spends about $100,000 a year in those efforts.

General themes
Yon's writing is marked by its fondness for American service personnel and Iraqis, both military and civilian alike. He sees those groups as engaging bravely in a just nation-building. USA Today has called him "unflinchingly pro-military". It is also marked by candor about what he regards as U.S. and Iraqi failures, which led The Los Angeles Times to label Yon a "lone gun". For example, Yon notably covered the story of an Iraqi taxi driver mistakenly killed by U.S. troops. Yon's work is often graphic in its nature compared to other reporting.

Yon's reports detail his conflicts with the U.S. military command as well, which culminated in an October 2008 article in The Weekly Standard titled "Censoring Iraq". In particular, Yon has accused Barry A. Johnson of US Central Command of "a subtle but all too real censorship" as well as "ineptitude in handling the press". The article nearly caused the military to ban Yon from re-entering Iraq. Yon frequently criticizes what he sees as inept public relations efforts from the Army staff.

The style of Yon's reports has garnered praise from The New York Times, calling it "enough first-hand observation, clarity and skepticism to put many professional journalists to shame", as well as Slate, calling it "the grizzled, noirish [sic] style of war reportage from earlier eras." Military.com has stated that Yon re-defined war coverage for the new media.

Yon has also been criticized by members of the Army, such as by Lt. Col. Steven Boylan in September 2005, who have said that he violated his embed agreement by releasing photos of dead and injured soldiers before their family members were notified. He also has been accused of skirting Army rules by working before he formally signed up with a news agency. However, Yon is not employed by any news organization, and employment by a news organization is not a requirement for embedding with U.S. Forces.

Yon's editorial columns have run in National Review Online and in The New York Post. Although working as a writer, Yon crossed the line in Mosul and engaged in combat in an attempt to save the lives of four American soldiers.  The Commander, Lieutenant Colonel Erik Kurilla, had been shot three times, while Command Sergeant Major (CSM) Robb Prosser was fighting hand-to-hand combat with the Al Qaeda member who just shot Kurilla.  Two American Soldiers, frozen in fear, refused to fight.  Yon had a chance to flee but instead, while CSM Prosser was fighting the terrorist hand-to-hand, he grabbed Prosser's empty rifle, took ammunition from a lieutenant who refused to fight, and Yon joined combat. His dispatch about the incident became his best known work, but it led to a strict reprimand from the Army administration. He wrote in August 2009 that it is not his place to directly interfere in what he covers.

Awards and media references
Yon won the 2008 Weblog Award Poll for 'Best Military Blog' on December 31, 2008, and he won the 2007 Weblog Award for 'Best Military Blog' on November 1, 2007. He won the 2005 Weblog Award for 'Best Media/Journalism Blog' as well. In January 2006, his blog was one of the 100 most linked on the internet according to Technorati. Websites for the CNN, ABC, and CBS networks have referred to his work. He has appeared on the CBS Early Show and Good Morning America shows.

Yon has been quoted by Fox News, and by Times Online. His reporting has gained the praise of some well-known and respected journalists, including Christopher Booker and Toby Harnden of The Daily Telegraph, Brian Williams of NBC, foreign correspondent Joe Galloway, Alex Perry of Time, and US News and World Report writer Michael Barone. Barone has referred to Yon's work in his column. Oliver North has supported Yon's reporting, and John Gibson cited Yon in an editorial. New York University professor Jay Rosen has named Yon's writing as a prominent example of successful citizen journalism. Bruce Willis has stated his intention to produce a movie about Deuce Four's deployment in Iraq, to be largely based on Yon's experiences with the unit. Willis said, “What he is doing is something the American media and maybe the world media isn’t doing... telling the truth about what's happening in the war in Iraq.”

Selected writings and related issues

2005 – Little Girl story and photograph

In May 2005, Yon took a picture of U.S. Army Major Mark Bieger cradling an Iraqi girl, named Farah, wounded by shrapnel from a car bomb. Major Bieger tried to take the girl to an American hospital to receive treatment, but she died on the helicopter ride. Yon wrote shortly after taking the picture that it "provoked a flood of messages and heartfelt responses from caring people around the world."

The photo created international news media attention as well. It was submitted to Time. Their website's viewers selected it as the 'Top Photo of 2005'. It received 66% of the vote. An Islamic-based non-violence organization asked to use the picture, and Yon gave his permission. Documentary filmmaker Michael Moore used the photo without permission at michaelmoore.com, with it placed alongside then-Senator Hillary Clinton attacking her support for the invasion of Iraq. In May 2008, Yon wrote that he planned to sue Moore for copyright infringement and described some of Moore's media work as pornographic.

2006 – Battle with Shock magazine
In 2006, the 'Little Girl' image was the center of a controversy when it was used by the Hachette Filipacchi Médias’ publication Shock magazine. The magazine displayed the picture in a context that was critical of the war in Iraq. Yon felt this usage of the photo both dishonored U.S. troops and breached his copyright. He especially criticized the fact that the agency released the disputed article on Memorial Day.

Yon contacted his lawyers and agreed with Hachette Filipacchi Médias that he would be paid a licensing fee, with the majority of proceeds going to a charity supporting US military families. On June 9, 2006, the agreement appears to have collapsed, with Yon alleging further misuse of the image by Hachette Filipacchi Médias at its shocku.com website.

2007 – Reporting atrocities by Al-Qaeda in Iraq
Through June and July 2007, Yon followed multinational forces in battles at and around Baqubah during Operation Arrowhead Ripper, and he reported that the forces discovered a mass grave at the al Hamari village. Yon stated that Al Qaeda elements had murdered hundreds of innocent people in the area. He compared the scene to the 'Killing Fields' of Cambodia. He speculated from the positions of some of the bodies' that the militants may have forced a father to dig the graves of his children before their summary execution.

Yon wrote on July 18 that the news media had been ignoring the story. An Iraqi official later said that the insurgents had, among other atrocities, baked a young boy and served him to his parents. Yon himself wrote in a later dispatch that he offers "no opinion about the veracity of [the official's] words".

2008 – Moment of Truth in Iraq
In April 2008, Yon published his second book, Moment of Truth in Iraq, through Richard Vigilante Books. The book describes how U.S. counterinsurgency methods are creating what Yon sees as a foundation of success in Iraq. Within two weeks of its release date, Moment of Truth entered into Amazon.com's list of Top 10 bestsellers. Yon was quoted by fellow blogger Glenn Reynolds as saying, "That's just wild. Folks really did want that book after all. I was wondering how many people even cared. It's great to know that people want to really know what's going on."

2010 – Conflicts with ISAF military command
Through spring 2010, Yon engaged in an ongoing war of words with Canadian Army Brigadier-General Daniel Menard and US General Stanley McChrystal, the latter who commanded International Security Assistance Force (ISAF).

Yon accused Menard of incompetence when the Tarnak Bridge was destroyed by insurgents, near the Canadian Area of Operations, claiming that Menard had been watching a hockey game at the time. 
When it was publicly demonstrated that the bridge was not a Canadian responsibility, Yon blasted Menard for negligently firing his weapon in Kandahar. Yon publicly admitted that he would not have looked into the rumors of the negligent discharge(ND), if it weren't for the bridge controversy. Menard was later charged with an inappropriate relationship with a subordinate. While Yon complained that neither the ND nor affair was the issue, he claimed victory in taking the General's "scalp." 

The attacks on a coalition partner and allied General were embarrassing to the ISAF and diplomatic efforts. It appears that this resulted in a breakdown of relationships between Yon and the Public Affairs Office of McChrystal, which Yon described as "crazy monkeys."

Despite Yon's praise for General McChrystal on the eve of the Tarnak Bridge incident, his Facebook updates became increasingly critical after Yon was disembedded. While most of Yon's criticism focused on McChrystal's media relations, he also criticized Stanley McChrystal's war strategy on many occasions, particularly the restrictive Rules of engagement under his command. Daily Telegraph journalist Toby Harnden described Yon's commentary as "excoriating".

After publication of a June 2010 Rolling Stone article containing controversial quotes from McChrystal and his staff, which mocked their civilian Obama administration colleagues, Yon wrote; "Unless McChrystal basically denies the article, he must be fired. If he is not fired, I will start calling him President McChrystal because Obama clearly is not in charge." Both McChrystal and Menard later left their commands.

After General David H. Petraeus was appointed to Stanley McCrystal's command, Yon sent Petraeus a message of support and later wrote on his Facebook page that Petraeus sent back "a nice response".

In 2013, Yon criticized General Martin Dempsey for the policy of painting a bright red crosses on medical evacuation helicopters. Yon felt it identified them as unarmed targets.

2015 – Comfort women
In September 2007, Yon spoke at the 2007 conference of the Nazi War Crimes and Japanese Imperial Government Records Interagency Working Group to claim Japan's innocence on the sexual enslavement of the Imperial Japanese comfort women before and during WWII. However, he failed to mention a U.S. informant's report on the Japanese Military not preventing the abuse and rape of Malaysian women at 'licensed public comfort houses,' which led to historians and authors disagreeing with him.

In 2014, FeND Now Network's (Japan-U.S. Feminist Network for Decolonization) feminist writer, Emi Koyama, and Monthly Hanada Magazine's right-wing editor-in-chief, Kazuyoshi Hanada, reported Michael Yon receiving book deals, financial agreements, and speaking tours from Yoshiko Sakurai, a conservative member from the Global Alliance for Historical Truth, and the Nippon Kaigi. He published articles about denying the comfort women system as a form of sexual slavery in the English media and spoke at her think tank about it. Al Jazeera also reported that Yon viewed the comfort women issue as a strategic "information war" meant to keep Japan divided and weak.

In 2015, his affiliation deteriorated when he opposed Sakurai's attempt to promote the film Scottsboro Girls in Japan and America. A film directed by Taniyama Yūjirō aimed to draw a parallel between the Scottsboro Boys. They were a group of African-American young men falsely accused of raping white women - and the comfort women Taniyama was claiming were prostitutes who were lying about having been raped. Yon warned Sakurai and Taniyama Yūjirō that promoting the film would not only damage Japan but offend America because of the film's lack of understanding of American values. When Mariko Okada-Collins, a Japanese language instructor from Central Washington University invited them to show the film in her university, he terminated his deal with Sakurai. Though he broke off with the other Japanese nationalist movements, he continues to publish many posts on his blog and social media to this day, claiming this issue to be a lie. In 2018, he published his full-length Japanese book on this topic.

Kopp–Etchells effect

The effect is a consequence of sand hitting helicopter rotors in sandy environments. Abrasion strips on helicopter rotor blades are made of metal, often titanium or nickel, which are very hard, but less hard than sand. When a helicopter flies low to the ground in desert environments, sand striking the rotor blade can cause erosion. At night, sand hitting the metal abrasion strip causes a visible corona or halo around the rotor blades. The effect is caused by the pyrophoric oxidation of eroded particles and is known as the Kopp–Etchells effect.

Michael Yon observed the effect while accompanying U.S. soldiers in Afghanistan. When he discovered the effect had no name he coined the name "Kopp–Etchells effect" after two soldiers who had died in the war, one American and one British.

See also
 Kandahar massacre

References

External links

 The Expat: Michael Yon (Thai PBS Video)
 Michael Yon Online Magazine
 Citizen Journalist Michael Yon's 'Truth in Iraq'. (w/excerpt from the book) National Public Radio. Posted April 23, 2008.
 A Year in Iraq 2006 – Photos and Writing by Michael Yon
 Time Magazine Top 10 Viewer's Picks (See No. 2 for Michael Yon's photograph)
 Yon interview at  Radio America

1964 births
Living people
American alternative journalists
American male bloggers
American bloggers
American columnists
American people of the Iraq War
Photography in Iraq
United States Army soldiers
Members of the United States Army Special Forces
American war correspondents
People from Winter Haven, Florida
21st-century American non-fiction writers